Such Is the Law is a 1930 British drama film directed by Sinclair Hill and starring Frances Day, C. Aubrey Smith and Kate Cutler. It was made at Cricklewood Studios.

Premise 
A mother attempts to save her daughter's marriage.

Cast 
Kate Cutler as Mother
Frances Day as Wife
Maud Gill as Aunt's Maid
Carl Harbord as Vivian Fairfax
Gibb McLaughlin as Valet
Nancy Price as Aunt
Miriam Seegar as Other Woman
C. Aubrey Smith as Sir James Whittaker
Wyndham Standing as Doctor
Lady Tree as Granny
Janice Adair as Marjorie Majoribanks 
Pamela Carme as Mrs. Majoribanks
Bert Coote as Sir George
James Fenton as Solicitor
Rex Maurice as Philip Carberry

Production
The film was adopted from the silent film The Price of Divorce (1928), which had not been released.

References

Bibliography
 Low, Rachael. Filmmaking in 1930s Britain. George Allen & Unwin, 1985.
 Wood, Linda. British Films, 1927-1939. British Film Institute, 1986.

External links 
 

 Such Is the Law at BFI Film & TV Database

1930 films
British black-and-white films
British romantic drama films
1930 romantic drama films
Films shot at Cricklewood Studios
Stoll Pictures films
Films directed by Sinclair Hill
1930s English-language films
1930s British films